Edgar Devon Jones (born December 1, 1984) is a former American football linebacker. After playing college football at Southeast Missouri State, he was signed by the Baltimore Ravens as an undrafted free agent in 2007. He played for the Ravens for five seasons from 2007 to 2011. He also played for the Kansas City Chiefs and the Dallas Cowboys.

College career
He played college football at Southeast Missouri State, where he was named a first-team All-American following his senior season with he led all of Division I-AA with 12.0 quarterback sacks. He was named the MVP of the Magnolia Gridiron Classic - a postseason All-Star Game - after recording 4.0 sacks in that contest.

Professional career

Baltimore Ravens
Jones was signed by the Baltimore Ravens as an undrafted free agent in 2007. He filled a number of different roles as a Raven, including outside linebacker, defensive end, and tight end. His biggest contributions, however, came on special teams, where he established himself as one of their top special teams tacklers and blockers.

Kansas City Chiefs
Jones signed with the Kansas City Chiefs on July 29, 2012. He became one of the team's most valuable special teams players, leading the Chiefs with seven tackles and two fumbles recoveries on special teams, including one returned for his first NFL touchdown at the Tampa Bay Buccaneers on October 14, 2012.

On August 31, 2013, Jones and a seventh round draft choice (#238-Will Smith) were traded to the Dallas Cowboys in exchange for a sixth round draft choice (#193-Zach Fulton).

Dallas Cowboys
On October 18, 2013, Jones was placed on the injured reserve-designated to return list with an hernia. He was activated from injury reserve on December 14. He wasn't re-signed at the end of the season.

Cleveland Browns
Jones signed with the Cleveland Browns on July 24, 2014. He was released on August 4. He announced his retirement on February 25, 2015.

References

External links
Kansas City Chiefs bio
Southeast Missouri State RedHawks bio

1984 births
Living people
People from Rayville, Louisiana
Sportspeople from Monroe, Louisiana
Players of American football from Louisiana
African-American players of American football
American football linebackers
American football defensive ends
American football tight ends
Southeast Missouri State Redhawks football players
Baltimore Ravens players
Kansas City Chiefs players
Dallas Cowboys players
21st-century African-American sportspeople
20th-century African-American people